The Battle of Anandpur was fought at Anandpur, between the armies of the Sikh Guru Gobind Singh and the Mughal forces aided by the Nawab of Bahawalpur state, Rajas of the Sivalik Hills.

Cause

The increasing power of Guru Gobind Singh, and his establishment of a military order (Khalsa) alarmed the Rajas of the Sivalik hills. The hill Rajas were concerned about Gobind Singh's rising power and influence in their region and following the defeat of Alim Chand and Balia Chand that unnerved the hill Rajas. After some failed attempts to check the Guru's power, the Rajas teamed with the Mughal Emperor Aurangzeb and his Mughal General Wazir Khan to help them against the Guru.

The Mughal viceroy of Delhi sent his generals Din Beg and Painda Khan, each with an army of five thousand men, to subdue the Guru under direct orders from Aurangzeb.The Mughal forces were joined by the armies of the hill chiefs at Rupar. The Guru appointed the Panj Piare, his five  beloved Sikhs, as the generals of his army.

Battle

According to the Sikh chronicles, Guru Gobind Singh refused to play the role of an aggressor, as he had vowed never to strike except in self-defence. 

In the course of along action near Anandpur, northeast of Ludhiana, Painda Khan was killed—reputedly in single combat by Guru Gobind Singh. After Painde Khan's death, Din Beg assumed the command of his troops. However, he failed to overpower the Guru's forces. The hill Rajas fled from the battlefield, and Din Beg was forced to retreat after being wounded. He was pursued by the Guru's army as far as Rupar.

Aftermath

After the Mughal generals failed to drive off the Guru from Anandpur, the hill Rajas formed an alliance and attacked Anandpur, leading to the Battle of Anandpur (1701).

In popular culture
 The Battle of Anandpur is depicted in the movie Chaar Sahibzaade.

References

Anandpur
Anandpur, First Battle of
1701 in India
Anandpur